Povilas Leimonas (born 16 November 1987) is a Lithuanian professional footballer who plays as a defender for Sūduva Marijampolė.

Club career

Early years

Leimonas has been with FK Sūduva since 2005, after graduating from the club's academy. He made his debut for the first team on 9 June 2006, in the 3-0 loss to FBK Kaunas, coming on as a substitute in the 79th minute. Povilas scored his first goal for the club on 10 August 2008 in a 4-0 victory over Silute. The defender also played in Europe for the first time in 2008, as FK Sūduva competed in the 2008 UEFA Cup first qualifying round against The New Saints of Wales. After FK Sūduva defeated TNS over two legs, Leimonas played in the 1-0 away win over FC Red Bull Salzburg on 28 August 2008.

2009-2013

Leimonas played a bigger role in 2009, scoring three times in the league. He again featured in the UEFA Europa League, playing against Randers FC of Denmark twice, and scoring his team's goal in the 2nd leg 1-1 draw.

In 2010 Povilas played a bigger role still, featuring in 16 of Suduva's league matches and also playing in UEFA Europa League matches against Rapid Wien. He also played in three Baltic League fixtures, two of which were against FC Flora Tallinn. 2011 saw Leimonas score four times in eighteen league games and compete in the UEFA Europa League against Elfsborg of Sweden.

In July 2012, Leimonas travelled to Poland to join top-flight side Widzew Łódź on trial, with a view to a permanent deal. The defender featured in Widzew's 0-0 friendly draw with Cypriot outfit AEK Larnaca on 4 August; however, negotiations with the club broke down and Leimonas returned to Suduva - even appearing in their 2-2 draw at VMFD Žalgiris Vilnius as a late substitute the following day.

Widzew Łódź 
On 30 August 2013 he signed with Widzew Łódź.

Jagiellonia Białystok 
On 23 June 2014 he signed with Jagiellonia Białystok.

International career

Lithuania B

Povilas played for Lithuania's "B" team in two games in 2011, both against Lithuania U-21. The first game, played in Vilnius on 9 February, was won 2-1 by the "B" team, and the second match, in Marijampole on 2 March, resulted in a 3-0 win.

Lithuania senior

Leimonas made his senior international debut on 7 June 2011, in a 1-0 friendly loss to Norway. He earned his second cap two months later in another friendly, the 3-0 win over Armenia on 10 August. Povilas wears the no.5 shirt when playing for his country.

References

External links
 
 

1987 births
Living people
Sportspeople from Marijampolė
Lithuanian footballers
Lithuania international footballers
Lithuanian expatriate footballers
Association football defenders
FK Sūduva Marijampolė players
Widzew Łódź players
Jagiellonia Białystok players
GKS Katowice players
A Lyga players
Ekstraklasa players
Expatriate footballers in Poland
Lithuanian expatriate sportspeople in Poland